The Labour Party is the fifth-largest political party in the Oireachtas. The Labour Party leader appoints a team of TDs and Senators to speak for the party on different issues. When the Labour Party was in Government their front bench consisted of the ministerial officeholders. The Labour Party has been in opposition since March 2016 and accordingly, their front bench areas of responsibility broadly correspond to those of Government ministers. The current front bench was announced on 7 July 2020, consisting of TDs and Senators.

The 2016–2020 front bench additionally featured former TDs and sitting County Councillors.

Labour Party Frontbench

Dáil Éireann

Seanad Éireann

Local Government

See also
Fianna Fáil Front Bench
Fine Gael Front Bench
Green Party Front Bench
Sinn Féin Front Bench
Social Democrats Front Bench (Ireland)

References

External links
Labour Party spokespersons

Labour Party (Ireland)
Front benches in the Oireachtas